Korea Exchange (KRX) is the sole securities exchange operator in South Korea. It is headquartered in Busan, and has an office for cash markets and market oversight in Seoul.

History 
The Korea Exchange was created through the integration of Korea Stock Exchange (KSE), Korea Futures Exchange and KOSDAQ Stock Market under the Korea Stock & Futures Exchange Act. The securities and derivatives markets of former exchanges are now business divisions of Korea Exchange: the Stock Market Division, KOSDAQ Market Division and Derivatives Market Division. As of Dec 2020, Korea Exchange had 2,409 listed companies with a combined market capitalization of ₩2.3 quadrillion KRW ($2.1 trillion USD). The exchange has normal trading sessions from 09:00 am to 03:30 pm on all days of the week except Saturdays, Sundays and holidays declared by the Exchange in advance.

On 22 May 2015, the Korea Exchange joined the United Nations Sustainable Stock Exchanges initiative in an event with the UN-SG Ban Ki-moon in attendance, as well as senior officials from UN Global Compact and UNCTAD.

Traded Instruments
KOSPI Market Division
 Stocks
 Bonds
 Exchange Traded Funds (ETFs)
 Exchange-Linked Warrants (ELWs)
 Real Estate Investment Trusts (REITs)

KOSDAQ Market Division
 Stocks

Derivatives Market Division
 Index Instruments: KOSPI 200 Index Futures, KOSTAR Futures, KOSPI 200 Index Options
 Single Stock Futures
 Equity Options
 Interest Rate Instruments: 3-Year KTB (Korea Treasury Bond) Futures, 5-Year KTB Futures, 10-Year KTB Futures
 Foreign Exchange Instruments: USD Futures, JPY Futures, EUR Futures, USD Options
 Commodity Instruments: Gold Futures, Mini-gold Futures, Lean Hog Futures

See also
Korea Financial Investment Association
List of East Asian stock exchanges

References

External links
Korea Exchange Website

 
Stock exchanges in South Korea
Futures exchanges
Financial services companies established in 1953
Companies based in Busan
1953 establishments in South Korea